Théâtre de la Gaîté may refer to:

Théâtre de la Gaîté (boulevard du Temple), a former theatre in Paris (1759-1862)
Théâtre de la Gaîté (rue Papin), a former theatre in Paris (1862-1989)
La Gaîté Lyrique, a modern arts centre in Paris, opened in 2010, that incorporates parts of the old Théâtre de la Gaîté on rue Papin.